Royal Oak is an area in North Yorkshire, England, between Scarborough and Bridlington, next to Filey and Hunmanby. Two railway junctions that formed a spur to the railway station at Filey Holiday Camp were also located just to the south of the A165 crossing. These were known as the Royal Oak Junctions.

It is home to a string of bungalows, and across the A165 is a blue house which was formerly the Gate keepers Cottage. In front of the inn is the location of a deserted medieval village known as Fowthorpe. It was historically part of the East Riding of Yorkshire until 1974.

References

Hamlets in North Yorkshire